The Inca, The Silly Girl, and the Son of a Thief (Spanish: El inca, la boba y el hijo del ladrón) is a 2011 Peruvian romantic drama film written and directed by Ronnie Temoche in his directorial debut. Starring Carlos Cubas, Flor Quesada, Manuel Baca and Evelyn Azabache.

Synopsis 
In a small town in northern Peru, three simple and marginal characters have or possess nothing, but they are not resigned to living without love. "El Inca" is a rude catchascan fighter who, in old age, loses his job. Seeing himself finished, without money or family, he wanders the streets looking for something that gives meaning to the last years of his life. “La Boba”, an illusory waitress at a roadside restaurant, dreams of finding among the travelers she serves, and in the few minutes they devour her dishes, the ideal man, the love of her life. But when he thinks he finds it, you start his problems. "The Thief's Son" has no peace. Everyone points to them with contempt for being the son of the heartless criminal who swindled the entire town. Only María loves him, his young wife who is about to give birth. With no hope in sight, determined to do anything, he will look for a better destiny for himself and his family.

Cast 
The actors participating in this film are:

 Evelyn Azabache
 Manuel Baca
 Oscar Beltrán
 Carlos Cubas
 Alejandra Guerra
 Flor Quezada

Financing 
The Inca, The Silly Girl, and the Son of a Thief won The Global Film Initiative (GFSI) award and the Conacine 2010 Post Production II and Distribution Contest II award where they contributed money to finish the film.

Release 
The Inca, The Silly Girl, and the Son of a Thief premiered in August 2011 at the Lima Film Festival, and was released commercially on September 1, 2011, in Peruvian theaters.

Awards

References

External links 

 

2011 films
2011 romantic drama films
Peruvian romantic drama films
Peruvian road movies
2010s Spanish-language films
2010s Peruvian films
Films set in Peru
Films shot in Peru
Films about poverty
2011 directorial debut films